The Czech Republic women's national ball hockey team is the women's national ball hockey team of the Czech Republic, and a member of the International Street and Ball Hockey Federation (ISBHF).  The team has competed in every Women’s Ball Hockey World Championship since its inception in 2007.

History
In 2009, the Czech Republic were the host country for the first time in the history of the Women's Ball Hockey World Championship. With games contested in the city of Plzeň, the team enjoyed a podium finish.

World Championships

Awards and honors
Katherina Becevova, Best Goalkeeper: 2013 Ball Hockey World Championship
Lucie Povová, Forward, 2013 Ball Hockey World Championship All-Star Team
Katerina Zechovska, 2017 Ball Hockey World Championship Most Valuable Player
Denisa Křížová, 2017 Ball Hockey World Championship Best Forward
 Lucie Manhartová, 2017 Ball Hockey World Championship All-Tournament Team Selection 
 Veronika Volkova, 2017 Ball Hockey World Championship All-Tournament Team Selection
Denisa Křížová, 2019 Ball Hockey World Championship Scoring Champion
Denisa Křížová, 2019 Ball Hockey World Championship All-Tournament Team Selection
Lucie Manhartová, 2019 Ball Hockey World Championship All-Tournament Team Selection

References

External links 
 inbhf.com

Ball hockey
Women's sport in the Czech Republic
Ball hockey